Planet Ant is a non-profit artist community housed in a three-story tenement in Hamtramck, Michigan. The community has several branches, including a record label, a theatre company, an improv colony and a film production company.

Planet Ant is a valuable example of an artist incubator where young actors, directors, sound designers, and stage managers practice their craft as they audition for more prestigious jobs. In the area of Detroit culture, at least five actors in major roles can trace their beginning to Planet Ant. Planet Ant also hosts one of two vital, international film festivals in the Southwestern Michigan region, the second being Detroit Docs. 

The concern has operated since 1996 and has won support from the Michigan Council for Arts & Cultural Affairs.

External links 

Planet Ant Website
Planet Ant Film and Video Fest

Non-profit organizations based in Michigan
Culture of Detroit
Buildings and structures in Michigan
Arts centers in Michigan
Organizations established in 1996
1996 establishments in Michigan